Eseldrift is a town in Waterberg District Municipality in the Limpopo province of South Africa.

References

Populated places in the Mogalakwena Local Municipality